Laughing leek orchid may refer to:

 Prasophyllum macrostachyum, endemic to Western Australia
 Prasophyllum gracile - as the little laughing leek orchid